Sybra variefasciata is a species of beetle in the family Cerambycidae. It was described by Breuning in 1973. It is known from Borneo.

References

variefasciata
Beetles described in 1973